Champsac is a commune in the Haute-Vienne department in the Nouvelle-Aquitaine region in western France, sitting near to both the Dordogne and Charente borders.

Inhabitants are known as Champsacois.

The village is situated within the Dordogne-Limousin National Park. Amenities within Champsac include a butcher, a baker, a hairdresser, a church, a wine merchant, and a bar/hotel/restaurant and tabac named 'Le Champsac'.

It is also very near to other amenities such as supermarkets, châteaux, lakes, cycle paths, fishing spots, etc., and sits approximately 30 minutes south-west of Limoges – Bellegarde Airport. The historic city of Limoges and towns/villages such as Rochechouart, Oradour-sur-Glane, Saint-Junien and Châlus are also close by.

The joint Aquitaine-Limousin-Poitou-Charentes, in which Champsac will sit,  is a future Region of Southwestern France, created by the territorial reform of French Regions in 2014 by merger of Aquitaine, Limousin, and Poitou-Charentes. It will cover   - or 1/8 of the country - and will have 5,808,594 inhabitants. The new region will take effect after the regional elections of December 2015, on 1 January 2016.

See also
Communes of the Haute-Vienne department

References

Communes of Haute-Vienne